The Teledyne CAE F106 (company designation Model 472) was a small American turbofan engine developed to power cruise missiles.

Development and design

The F106 engine was developed during the early 1970s to power the missiles being developed for the United States Navy's cruise missile competition. It powered the LTV YBGM-110 which lost the competition to the BGM-109 Tomahawk. While the F106 only powered the YBGM-110 prototype, either it or the Williams F107 could have powered either missile. However, the Navy selected the F107 engine with the BGM-109 missile.

The F106 engine was also a competitor to power the AGM-86 ALCM cruise missile for the United States Air Force, but it likewise lost to the Williams F107 engine.

Specifications (F106-CA-100)

See also

References

Low-bypass turbofan engines
1970s turbofan engines
F106